Thaification, or Thai-ization, is the process by which people of different cultural and ethnic origins living in Thailand become assimilated to the dominant culture of Thailand, that of central Thailand.

Thaification was a step in the creation in the early 20th century of the Thai nation state in which Thai Noi people (which Thai Chinese call them "Siamese", or "Central Thai") occupy a dominant position, as opposed to the historically multicultural Kingdom of Siam. A related term, "Thainess", describes the particular characteristics that distinguish Thai persons from others.

Since Field Marshal Plaek was overthrown in 1947 by Chinese commander Phin Choonhavan, Thaification trend was changed from Central Thainess into Thai Chinese dominant position.

Motives
Thaification is a byproduct of the nationalist policies mandated by the Thai state after the Siamese coup d'état of 1933. The coup leaders, said to be inspired by Western ideas of an exclusive nation state, acted more in accordance with their close German nationalist and anti-democratic counterparts (pre-Nazi) to effect kingdom-wide dominance by the central Thai culture. Minority-owned businesses, like the traditionally merchant Thai Chinese, were aggressively acquired by the state, which gave preferential contracts to ethnic Central Thais and cooperative ethnic Chinese.

Thai identity was mandated via 12 Thai cultural mandates and reinforced both in the heartlands and in rural areas. Central Thailand became economically and politically dominant, and Central Thais became the state-mandated language of the media, business, education, and all state agencies. Central Thai values were successfully inculcated into being perceived as the desirable national values, with increasing proportions of the population identified as Thai. Central Thai culture, being the culture of wealth and status, made it hugely attractive to a once-diverse population seeking to be identified with nationalist unity.

Targets
Initally the main targets of Thaification were ethnic Chinese and other ethnic groups on the edges of the kingdom, geographically and culturally: the Lao of Isan (อีสาน), the hill tribes of western and northern Thailand, and also Thai Noi who speak the Southern Thai language. There has also been a Thaification of the immigrant Indian and Vietnamese populations. Thaification also targeted the ethnic Malay but was perhaps least successful.

Central Thai once enjoy cultural advantages until 1947 Thai coup d'état, urban expansion in Bangkok, causing overwhelm amount of Central Thai Internal migration to Bangkok, they are often accused of being rural and discriminated against for their Central Thai dialects, known "Ner".

Policies
Thaification by the government can be separated into three sets of policies:

Rural development
In the first set of policies, the government targeted specific policies and actions at fringe groups. An example of this is the Accelerated Rural Development Programme of 1964, the Isan component of which included the strengthening of allegiance to Bangkok and the rest of the country as one of its objectives.

Education
The second set of policies consists of policies applied nationally, but that disproportionately affect fringe groups. One example of this is the prescribed use of Central Thai language in schools. This had little effect on the Central Thai (Thai Siam) and Thai Chinese who used the language as a native language, but made diglossia of speakers of Isan in the northeast, of Northern Thai in the north, Southern Thai in the south, and of Pattani Malay in the deep south.

Harsher methods were imposed on the Thai Chinese. After the People's Republic of China was founded in 1949, a series of anticommunist Thai military juntas, starting with that of right-wing dictator Plaek Phibunsongkhram, sharply reduced Chinese immigration and prohibited Chinese schools in Thailand.

Thai Chinese born after the 1950s had "very limited opportunities to enter Chinese schools". Those Thai Chinese who could afford to study overseas studied English instead of Chinese for economic reasons. As a result, the Chinese in Thailand have "almost totally lost the language of their ancestors", and are gradually losing their Chinese identity.

Encouraging Thai nationalism
A third set of policies was designed to encourage Thai nationalism in the nation's peoples. Examples include the promotion of the king as a national figurehead, saluting the flag in school and the twice daily broadcasts of the national anthem on radio and television at 08:00 and 18:00 as well as in public spaces. Encouraging Thai nationalism had the intended side effect of discouraging other loyalties, such as that to Laos, stemming from the central Thais' fear of Lao cultural and political dominance in the Isan region and that of Malay in the south.

See also

 Democracy Monument
 Education in Thailand
 History of Isan
 History of Thailand
 Internal colonialism
 Mandala (political model)
 Monthon
 Socialization
 South Thailand insurgency
 Tai Tham alphabet
 Thai cultural mandates
 Thai Exceptionalism
 Thai National Anthem
 Zomia (geography)

References

Further reading

External links
 "The impact of surveying and map-making in Siam" in Twentieth Century Impressions of Siam; Its History, People, Commerce, Industries, and Resources... Editor in chief: Arnold Wright. Assistant editor: Oliver T. Breakspear. Published 1908 by Lloyds Greater Britain Publishing Company, Ltd. London [etc.] Library of Congress classification: DS565.W7 Open Library
 In Defense of the Thai-Style Democracy. Pattana Kitiarsa. Asia Research Institute. National University of Singapore. October 12, 2006. PDF.

Society of Thailand
Social history of Thailand
1933 in Siam
 
Cultural assimilation
Thai nationalism